Artillery Wood Cemetery, near Boezinge, Belgium, is a Commonwealth War Graves Commission cemetery from the First World War.

The cemetery grounds were assigned to the United Kingdom in perpetuity by King Albert I of Belgium in recognition of the sacrifices made by the British Empire in the defence and liberation of Belgium during the war.

Establishment
The cemetery was established in 1917 after fighting in the immediate area – the Battle of Pilckem Ridge – had moved away and was used for burials until March 1918.

At the point of the Armistice there were some 141 graves in the cemetery. Concentration from the battlefields and three smaller cemeteries (Boesinghe Chateau Grounds, Brissein House and Captain's Farm) enlarged this to the present 1,307.

Notable burials 
It is the location of the grave of Hedd Wyn (1887–1917), posthumous winner of the bardic chair at the 1917 National Eisteddfod, and of Francis Ledwidge (1887–1917), the Irish poet.

References

External links

 
 Artillery Wood Cemetery at Find a Grave

Commonwealth War Graves Commission cemeteries in Belgium
World War I cemeteries in Belgium
Cemeteries and memorials in West Flanders